Canon is a city in Franklin and Hart counties in the U.S. state of Georgia. The population was 804 at the 2010 census.

History
Canon was originally called "West Bowersville", and under the latter name was laid out in 1875. The Georgia General Assembly incorporated the place as the "Town of Canon" in 1902, with the town corporate limits extending in a one-mile radius from the intersection of Broad and Depot streets.

Geography

Georgia State Routes 17 and 51 pass through the center of town. SR 17 leads south  to Royston, while SR 51 leads southwest by an indirect route  to Sandy Cross. The two highways together lead northeast  to Bowersville.

Demographics

As of the census of 2000, there were 755 people, 315 households, and 221 families residing in the city. The racial makeup of the city was 94.97% White, 2.52% African American, 0.13% Native American, 0.26% Asian, 0.66% from other races, and 1.46% from two or more races. Hispanic or Latino of any race were 1.19% of the population.

There were 315 households, out of which 27.9% had children under the age of 18 living with them, 52.7% were married couples living together, 12.1% had a female householder with no husband present, and 29.8% were non-families. 27.3% of all households were made up of individuals, and 11.4% had someone living alone who was 65 years of age or older.  The average household size was 2.40 and the average family size was 2.88.

In the city, the population was spread out, with 22.1% under the age of 18, 9.7% from 18 to 24, 26.5% from 25 to 44, 28.1% from 45 to 64, and 13.6% who were 65 years of age or older.  The median age was 38 years. For every 100 females, there were 93.6 males.  For every 100 females age 18 and over, there were 94.1 males.

The median income for a household in the city was $21,845, and the median income for a family was $24,375. Males had a median income of $25,446 versus $18,375 for females. The per capita income for the city was $12,855.  About 22.2% of families and 26.6% of the population were below the poverty line, including 33.0% of those under age 18 and 25.2% of those age 65 or over.

Notable person
Ernest Vandiver, Georgia governor from 1959 to 1963
Crash Davis, American professional baseball player whose name inspired that of the main character of the 1988 movie Bull Durham.

See also
Canon Commercial Historic District
Historic Churches of Canon Historic District

References

External links

Double Branches Baptist Church historical marker
Redwine Church historical marker

Cities in Georgia (U.S. state)
Cities in Franklin County, Georgia
Cities in Hart County, Georgia